Zuleika Kiara Suárez Torrenegra (born June 25, 1994, in San Andrés Island, Colombia) is a Colombian model and beauty queen who competed in the 61st version of Miss Colombia, gaining the title of Miss Colombia International /  first runner-up and representative of Colombia to Miss International 2014 where she again won the title of first-runner up.

Early life 
Zuleika Kiara Suarez was born on June 25, 1994, in Free Town, San Andrés, studies anthropology at the National University of Colombia.

Miss Colombia 2013 
Participate representing San Andrés in Miss Colombia 2013, held in Cartagena on November 11, 2013, in the end of the gala ended as Miss Colombia International / first runner up of the contest, giving the opportunity to compete in Miss International 2014 as a participant in Colombia

Miss International 2014 
Zuleika represented Colombia at the Miss International 2014 pageant, which was held in Tokyo, Japan, November 11, 2014, winning the title of first-runner up in addition to Miss Friendship award as well as Miss Best Dress award.

References 

Living people
Colombian female models
1994 births
Miss International 2014 delegates